Soul Gravy is the second studio album by the American rock/alternative country band Cross Canadian Ragweed, released in 2004 on Universal South Records. It features the singles "Sick and Tired" (a collaboration with Lee Ann Womack) and "Alabama", both of which charted on the Hot Country Songs charts.

Original, limited edition presses of the album featured a concert DVD as well.

Track listing
All songs written by Cody Canada except where noted.
"Number"  (Cody Canada, Stoney LaRue) – 3:35
"Again" (Canada, Randy Rogers) – 2:48
"Lonely Girl" – 3:54
"Cold Hearted Woman"  (Canada, Mike McClure) – 3:55  
"Sick and Tired" – 4:32
feat. Lee Ann Womack
"Hammer Down" – 3:38
"Flowers" – 2:36
"Leave Me Alone" – 3:51  
"Down" – 3:38
"Wanna Rock & Roll" (Ray Wylie Hubbard) – 5:16
"Alabama (New Version)"  (Canada, Ted Roberson) – 4:05
"Pay" – 3:29 
"Too Far Gone"  (Canada, McClure) and hidden track "Stranglehold" (Ted Nugent) – 11:33

DVD listing
"Anywhere but Here"
"Suicide Blues"
"17"
"Hammer Down"
"Carry Your Home" 
"Freedom"
"Constantly"
"Walls of Huntsville"
"Brooklyn Kid"
"Boys from Oklahoma"
"Long Way Home"
"42 Miles"
"Don't Need You"
"Alabama"
"Carney Man"
"Bang My Head"

Personnel

Cross Canadian Ragweed
Cody Canada - lead vocals, lead guitar
Grady Cross - rhythm guitar
Jeremy Plato - bass guitar, background vocals
Randy Ragsdale - drums, percussion

Additional musician
Steve Palousek - Dobro ("Down")

Chart performance

2004 albums
Cross Canadian Ragweed albums
Show Dog-Universal Music albums